A number of notable people have the surname Evans:

A list of fictional characters bearing the surname Evans is at the bottom of the page.

A
Aaron Evans (born 1993), Australian footballer (soccer)
Abel Evans (1679–1737), English clergyman, academic and poet
Adam Evans (born 1994), Irish footballer
Adriana Evans (born 1974), American R&B soul singer-songwriter
Adrienne Evans, British media and communications academic
Akayleb Evans (born 2000), American football player
Al Evans (1916–1979), American baseball player and manager
Alana Evans (born 1976), American pornographic actress
Alasdair Evans (born 1989), Scottish cricketer
 Alastair Ivan Ladislaus Lucidus d'Oyley-Evans, or Ivan, Viscount d'Oyley (1880–1904), US fencer for France
Albert Evans (disambiguation), multiple people
Albert Evans (footballer, born 1874) (1874–1966), footballer for Aston Villa, manager of Coventry City
Albert Evans (footballer, born 1901) (1901–1969), footballer for Woking, Tottenham Hotspur and Grantham
Albert Evans (politician) (1903–1988), British Labour Party politician
Albert Evans (dancer) (1968–2015), American; New York City Ballet principal dancer
Albert Evans (American football) (born 1989), US American football safety
Alec Evans (born 1939), Australian rugby union player and coach
Alex Evans (footballer) (born 1991), Welsh footballer
Alex Evans (model) (born 1989), British fashion model and winner of Britain's Next Top Model, Cycle 4
Alex Evans (video game developer), English video game developer and co-founder of Media Molecule
Alexander Evans (disambiguation), multiple people
Alfred Evans (cricketer, born 1858) (1858–1934), English cricketer
Alfred Evans (politician) (1914–1987), British Labour politician
 Sir Alfred Evans (Royal Navy officer) (1884–1944), British admiral and cricketer
Alfred John Evans (1889–1960), English cricketer
Alice Evans (born 1968), US-born, British actress
Alice Catherine Evans (1881–1975), American microbiologist
Alison Evans, British economist
 Alan, Allan, Allen and Alun Evans (disambiguation), multiple people
Alan Evans (1949–1999), Welsh darts player
Allan Evans (disambiguation), or Alan Evans, multiple people
Allan Evans (Australian sportsman) (1897–1955), Western Australian cricketer and footballer
Allan Evans (footballer) (1956–2020), Scotland international footballer and Aston Villa player
Allan Evans (record producer) (born 1956), American musicologist and record producer
Allen V. Evans, American politician in West Virginia
Alun Evans (born 1949), English footballer
Alun Evans (FAW) (1942–2011), Football Association of Wales Secretary General
Alun Evans (New Zealand footballer) (born 1965), New Zealand footballer
Alun Evans (cricketer) (born 1975), Welsh cricketer
Alun Tan Lan (Evans), Welsh singer-songwriter
Alvin Evans (1845–1906), American congressman from Pennsylvania
Alwen M. Evans (1895 - 1937), British entomologist and academic
Amy Evans (1884–1983), Welsh soprano and actress
Amy Burkhard Evans, American actress and musical director
Andrea Evans (born 1957), American actress
Andrew and Andy Evans (disambiguation), multiple people
Andrew Evans (pastor) (born 1935), Australian Pentecostal Christian pastor and politician
Andrew Evans (figure skater) (born 1988), Canadian pair skater
Andy Evans (racing driver) (born 1951), American former racing driver
Andy Evans (footballer) (born 1975), Welsh footballer
Ann Evans (midwife) (1840–1916), New Zealand nurse, midwife and refreshment rooms proprietor
Anne Evans (arts patron) (1871–?), art patron in Colorado
Anne Evans Estabrook, née Anne Evans, American real estate developer
Anna Evans Murray (1857–1955), American advocate of early childhood education
Annette Evans (born 1944), Scottish lawn bowler
Anthony Evans (disambiguation), multiple people
Anthony Walton White Evans (1817–1886), American civil engineer
Anthony Evans (judge) (born 1934), retired judge of the Court of Appeal of England and Wales
Anthony G. Evans (1942–2009), professor of mechanical engineering
Anthony Evans (skier) (born 1969), Australian cross country skier
Anthony Evans (basketball) (born 1970), head basketball coach at Florida International University
Anthony Evans (singer) (born 1978), American Christian singer-songwriter
April Evans, American soprano
Arise Evans (1607–1660), Welsh prophet and fanatic
Arthur Evans (disambiguation), multiple people
Art Evans (baseball) (1911–1952), Major League Baseball pitcher
Art Evans (born 1942), American actor
Arthur Benoni Evans (1781–1854), British writer
Arthur Evans (1851–1941), English archeologist
Arthur Humble Evans (1855–1943), British ornithologist
A. Grant Evans (1858–1929), American university administrator
Arthur Evans (goalkeeper) (1868–?), played football in the 1890s for Stoke FC
Arthur "Slim" Evans (1890–1944), Canadian trade unionist leader in Canada and the US
Arthur Evans (VC) (1891–1936), British soldier awarded the Victoria Cross
Arthur Evans (politician) (1898–1958), British Labour MP for Cardiff South, 1931–1945
 Arthur Evans (1903–1952), miner, boxer, rugby union and rugby league footballer known as Candy Evans
Arthur Reginald Evans (1905–1989), Australian army officer
Arthur Charles Evans (1916–2011), author of Sojourn in Silesia: 1940 – 1945
Arthur Evans (author) (1942–2011), gay rights activist, author of Witchcraft and the Gay Counterculture
Audrey Evans (1925–2022), British-born American pediatric oncologist
Augusta Jane Evans (1835–1909), American novelist

B
Bárbara Evans (born 1991), Brazilian model and reality TV celebrity
Barnaby Evans, American artist
Barry Evans (disambiguation), multiple people
Barry Evans (actor) (1943–1997), English actor and television performer
Barry Evans (baseball) (born 1956), American Major League Baseball third baseman
Barry Evans (rugby union) (born 1962), English rugby player
Barry Evans (footballer, born 1963), Australian rules footballer for Collingwood
Bart Evans (polo), American polo player
Bart Evans (born 1970), American baseball player
Ben and Benjamin Evans (disambiguation), multiple people
Ben Evans (born 1975), Welsh rugby union player
Ben Evans (rugby league) (born 1992), Welsh rugby league player
Benjamin Evans (minister) (1740–1821), Welsh congregational minister
Benjamin Evans (Baptist minister) (1844–1900), Welsh clergyman and Secretary of the Baptist Missionary Society
Benjamin Evans, Baron Evans of Hungershall (1899–1982), British academic
Bentley Kyle Evans (born 1966), American TV writer, producer, director and actor
Bernard Evans (architect) (1905–1981), Australian army officer and architect
Bernard Evans (footballer) (1937–2019), English footballer
Bernie Evans (born 1957), Australian rules footballer
Bert Evans (1922–2008), Welsh-American footballer (soccer)
Bertram Evans (1872–1919), English cricketer
Beryl Evans (1922–2006), Australian politician
Bill, Billie and Billy Evans (disambiguation), multiple people
Bill Evans (rugby union) (1857–1935), Welsh rugby union international
Bill Evans (1910s pitcher) (1893–1946), American baseball player for the Pirates
Bill Evans (1940s pitcher) (1919–1983), American baseball player for the Red Sox and White Sox
Bill Evans (1929–1980), American jazz pianist and composer
Bill Evans (dancer), American dancer and choreographer
Bill Evans (saxophonist) (born 1958), American jazz saxophonist
Bill Evans (meteorologist) (born 1960), American; Eyewitness News This Morning
 Billie Evans, married name of British singer and actress Billie Piper when she was married to DJ Chris Evans
Billy Evans (1884–1956), American baseball umpire
Billy Evans (footballer, born 1921) (1921–1960), English football player
Billy Lee Evans (born 1941), American politician from Georgia
Billy Evans (1932–2020), American college and international basketball player
Billy Evans (born 1947), American professional basketball player
Blair Evans (born 1991), Australian swimmer
Blake Evans (born 1980), Canadian ice hockey centre
Bob and Bobby Evans (disambiguation), multiple people
Bob Evans (footballer) (Robert Owen Evans, 1881–1962), 1900s-era Welsh goalkeeper
Bob Evans (coach) (Melbourne C. "Bob" Evans), 1910s-era American university sports coach
Bob Evans (restaurateur) (1918–2007), restaurateur and founder of Bob Evans Restaurants
Bob Evans (rugby union) (1921–2003), Wales international rugby union player
Bob Evans (basketball) (1925–1997), American NBA player
Bob O. Evans (1927–2004), computer pioneer and corporate executive
Bob Evans (racing driver) (born 1947), British Formula One driver
Bob Evans (wrestler) (born 1972), American professional wrestler and trainer
Bobby Evans (footballer) (1927–2001), Scottish footballer who played for Celtic and Chelsea F.C.
Bobby Evans (Canadian football) (born 1967), Canadian football player
Brad Evans (disambiguation), multiple people
Brendan Evans (born 1986), American tennis player
Brennan Evans (born 1982), Canadian ice hockey player
Brett Evans (Australian footballer) (born 1972), Australian rules footballer from Victoria
Brett Evans (born 1982), South African footballer
Brian Evans (disambiguation), multiple people
Brian Evans (cricketer, born 1936) (1936–2011), Glamorgan and Lincolnshire cricketer
Brian Evans (footballer) (1940–2003), Welsh footballer
Brian Evans (politician) (born 1950), Canadian lawyer and provincial politician from Alberta, Canada
Brian Evans (cricketer, born 1964), Hertfordshire cricketer
Brian Evans (basketball) (born 1973), American basketball player
Bruce Evans (politician) (1925–2012), Australian politician
Bruce Evans (bishop) (1929–1993), Anglican bishop and author
Bruce A. Evans (born 1946), American film director
Bryn Evans (rugby league), rugby league footballer who played in the 1920s
Bryn Evans (rugby union, born 1902)
Bryn Evans (rugby union, born 1984)
Byron Evans (born 1964), American football linebacker

C
C. Lawrence Evans, American political scientist
C. Stephen Evans (born 1948), American historian and philosopher
Cadel Evans (born 1977), Australian cyclist
Candy Evans (1903–1952), Welsh miner, boxer, rugby union and rugby league player
Caradoc Evans (1878–1945), Welsh writer, novelist and playwright
Ceri Evans (born 1963), New Zealand international footballer (soccer)
Charles Evans (disambiguation), multiple people
Charlie Evans (disambiguation), multiple people
Charlotte Evans, British skier, sighted guide and paralympian
Charlotte Evans, English actress
Ched Evans, Welsh footballer
Cheryl A. Gray Evans, Louisiana politician
Chick Evans (Charles E. Evans, Jr., 1890–1979), American amateur golfer
Chris Evans (disambiguation), multiple people
Christine Evans (poet) (born 1943), English poet
Christine Evans (singer-songwriter) (born 1990), Canadian singer-songwriter
Christmas Evans (1766–1838), Welsh Nonconformist minister
Christopher Evans (disambiguation), multiple people
Christopher Evans (outlaw) (1847–1917), American train robber
Christopher Evans (theologian) (1909–2012), English chaplain and theologian
Christopher Evans (computer scientist) (1931–1979), British computer scientist, psychologist and writer on pseudo-science
Christopher Evans (author) (born 1951), British author of science fiction and children's books
Christopher Leith Evans (born 1954), American artist
Christopher Evans-Ironside or Chris Evans, English/German composer and musician
Christopher Evans (businessman), Welsh biotech entrepreneur
Christopher Evans (musician) (born 1987), Ugandan composer, vocalist and entertainer
Chuck Evans (American football) (Charles Evans, 1967–2008), American football fullback
Chuck Evans (basketball) (born 1971), American basketball player
Cindy Evans (born 1952), American politician in Hawaii
Claire Evans (born 1983), Welsh beauty pageant title holder
Claire L. Evans, American singer and writer
Claude Evans (1933–1982), Canadian ice hockey goaltender
Clay Evans (pastor) (1925–2019), influential 20th-century African-American Baptist pastor in Chicago
Clay Evans (swimmer) (born 1953), Canadian Olympic swimmer
Clement A. Evans (1833–1911), American Civil War Confederate general
Clif Evans (1948–2022), Canadian provincial politician (Manitoba)
Cliff Evans (rugby league), Welsh rugby league player in the 1930s and 1940s
Clifford Evans (disambiguation), multiple people
Clint Evans (1889–1975), American college baseball coach
Clint Evans (rower), British rower
Clive Evans (fashion designer) (born 1933), English fashion designer
Clive Evans (footballer) (born 1957), English footballer
Clyde Evans (1938–2021), American politician in Ohio
Colin Evans (rugby) (1936–1992), Welsh rugby union and rugby league international
Colin Evans (medium), Welsh fraudster
Colleen Ballinger Evans (born 1986), American internet comedian, actress and singer
Corky Evans (born 1948), US-born Canadian politician in British Columbia
Corry Evans (born 1990), Northern Irish footballer
Craig Evans (disambiguation), multiple people
Craig Evans (Australian footballer) (born 1965), Australian rules footballer who played in the VFL
Craig Evans (Zimbabwean sportsman) (born 1969), Zimbabwean cricketer and rugby union footballer
Craig Evans (Welsh cricketer) (born 1971), former Welsh cricket batsman
Craig A. Evans (21st century), Canadian biblical scholar
Craig Evans (boxer) (born 1989), Welsh boxer
Cyril Furmstone Evans (1892–1959), wireless telegraphist, associated with the RMS Titanic
Cyril Edward Evans (1896–1975), New Zealand cricketer and rugby player

D
Dai Evans (1872–1912), Welsh rugby union international
Dai Evans (footballer, born 1902) (1902–1951), Welsh international footballer
Dai Morgan Evans (1944–2017), British archaeologist and academic
Dailan Evans (born 1971), Australian actor and comedian
Dale Evans (1912–2001), American actress and Roy Rogers's wife
Daly Cherry-Evans (born 1989), Australian Rugby League player
Damaris Evans (born 1975), British fashion designer
Damon Evans (born 1949), American actor
Damon Evans, American collegiate athletics director
Dan Evans (baseball) (born 1960), American baseball executive
Dana Evans (basketball) (1874–1924), American (male) coach in multiple sports and college athletic administrator
Dana Evans (basketball) (born 1998), American women's basketball player
Dani Evans (born 1985), American fashion model
Daniel Evans (disambiguation), multiple people
Daniel Evans (minister) (1774–1835), Welsh independent Christian minister
Daniel Evans (Welsh poet) (Daniel Ddu o Geredigion) (1792–1846), Welsh poet
Daniel Silvan Evans (1818–1903), Welsh scholar and lexicographer
Daniel Evans (bishop) (1900–1962), Anglican bishop in South America
Daniel J. Evans (born 1925), Governor of Washington and United States Senator
Daniel Evans (singer) (born 1969), X Factor 2008 finalist
Daniel Evans (actor) (born 1973), Welsh actor
Daniel Evans (rugby player) (born 1988), Welsh rugby union player
Daniel Evans (tennis) (born 1990), English tennis player
Danielle Valore Evans, American writer
Danny Evans (cricketer) (born 1987), Middlesex cricketer
Darrell Evans (born 1947), American baseball player
Darrell Evans (musician), presumably American musician
Darren Evans (born 1988), US American footballer
Darrynton Evans (born 1998), American football player
Daryl Evans (born 1961), Canadian ice hockey player
David Evans (disambiguation), multiple people
Dave Evans (racing driver) (1898–1974), American racecar driver
Dave Evans (footballer) (born 1958), English footballer
Dave Evans (reporter) (born 1962), American reporter with WABC-TV
David Evans (MP for Cardiff) (died 1568), MP for Cardiff
David Evans (Canon at St Asaph) (1705–1788), Welsh clergyman and writer
David R. Evans (South Carolina politician) (1769–1843), U.S. Representative from South Carolina
David Ellicott Evans (1788–1850), U.S. Representative from New York, 1827
David Morier Evans (1819–1874), financial journalist
David Evans (Archdeacon of St Asaph) (died 1910), Welsh priest
David H. Evans (1837–1920), New York politician
David William Evans (1866–1926), Welsh lawyer, public servant and rugby international
David Evans (cricketer, born 1869) (1869–1907), 22 first-class matches between 1889 and 1902
David Evans (composer) (1874–1948), Welsh composer
David Evans (rugby) (1886–1940), rugby union and rugby league footballer who played in the 1900s, and 1910s
 David Emrys Evans (1891/2–1966), Welsh classicist and university principal
David Evans (microbiologist) (1909–1984), British microbiologist
David Morgan Evans (1911–1941), Welsh rugby union and rugby league footballer
David Arthur Evans (1915–1989), Canadian politician in the Legislative Assembly of Ontario
David Stanley Evans (1916–2004), British astronomer
David C. Evans (1924–1998), American computer graphics pioneer
David Evans (RAF officer) (1924–2020), Air Chief Marshal/Senior Commander in the Royal Air Force
David Evans (RAAF officer) (1925–2020), Air Marshal in the Royal Australian Air Force
David Evans (Somerset cricketer, born 1928) (1928–1991), eight first-class matches in 1953
David Evans (Victorian politician) (born 1934), Australian politician in the Victorian Legislative Council
David Evans (umpire) (1933–1990), cricketer with Glamorgan and Test match umpire
David Evans (British politician) (1935–2008), British businessman and Conservative politician, MP 1987–1997
David Evans (mathematician) (born 1940), professor of applied mathematics at University of Bristol
David Allan Evans (born 1940), American poet
David A. Evans (1941–2022), organic chemistry professor at Harvard University
David Evans, Baron Evans of Watford (born 1942), British trade unionist and businessman
David Evans (West Virginia politician) (born 1945), member of the West Virginia House of Delegates
David W. Evans (born 1946), U.S. Representative from Indiana, 1975–1983
David Andreoff Evans (born 1948), computational linguist, entrepreneur
David F. Evans (born 1951), American leader in The Church of Jesus Christ of Latter-day Saints
Dave Evans (singer) (born 1953), first lead singer of the rock band AC/DC
David S. Evans (born 1954), economist and lecturer at UCL and the University of Chicago Law School
David Evans (administrator) (born 1960), American relief organisation officer
 David Howell Evans (born 1961), guitarist of Irish rock band U2, better known as The Edge
David M. Evans (born 1962), American movie director, producer, writer and actor
David Evans (athlete) (born 1967), Australian Paralympian
David Evans (footballer) (born 1967), English footballer with Chester City
David Evans (Yale professor) (born 1970), professor of geology and geophysics at Yale University
David Evans (squash player) (born 1974), Welsh professional squash player
David Evans (rugby player) (born 1988), Welsh Sevens and Neath RFC
David E. Evans, professor of mathematics at Cardiff University
David Evans (musicologist), ethnomusicologist at the University of Memphis
David Evans (mathematician and engineer), worked for the Australian Greenhouse Office
De Scott Evans (1847–1898), American artist
Dean Evans (field hockey) (born 1967), Australian Olympic field hockey player
Dean Evans (born 1990), Australian soccer player
Debbie Evans (born 1958), American motorcycle observed-trials competitor and stunt rider
Deborah Evans-Quek (born 1961), Welsh chess master
Debra Evans (born 1953), American writer
De Lacy Evans (1787–1870), British Army general
Delyth Evans (born 1958), Welsh politician
Demetric Evans (born 1979), American football defensive end
Demi Evans (born 1960s), American jazz vocalist
Denis and Dennis Evans (disambiguation), multiple people
Denis Evans (born 1951), Australian scientist
Dennis Frederick Evans (1928–1990), English inorganic chemist
Dennis Evans (footballer, born 1930) (1930–2000), English footballer who played for Arsenal
Dennis Evans (footballer, born 1935), British footballer who played for Wrexham and Tranmere Rovers
DeQuin Evans (born 1987), Canadian football defensive linesman
Derrick Evans (born 1952), Jamaican-born British exercise instructor known as Mr. Motivator
Diana Evans (born 1971), English novelist
Diane Carlson Evans (born 1946), American nurse
Dick Evans (footballer) (1875–1942), English footballer
Dick Evans (American football) (1917–2008), American football player
Dik Evans (born 1950s), Irish rock guitarist, brother of 'The Edge'
Dixie Evans (1926–2013), American burlesque dancer and stripper
Doc Evans (1907–1977), American jazz cornetist
Dominic Evans (born 1970), Welsh racing driver
Don and Donald Evans (disambiguation), multiple people
Don Evans (1938–2003), American playwright, theatre director, actor and educator
Donald Evans (American poet) (1884–1921), American poet, publisher, music critic and journalist
Donald Randell Evans (1912–1975), Royal Air Force air chief marshal
Donald Evans (Welsh poet) (born 1940), Welsh poet, who writes in the Welsh language
Donald W. Evans, Jr. (1943–1967), American soldier and Medal of Honor recipient
Donald Evans (artist) (1945–1977), American artist
Donald Evans (born 1946), US Secretary of Commerce (2001–2005)
Donald Leroy Evans (1957–1999), American serial killer
Donald Evans (American football) (born 1964), former American football defensive end
Doug and Douglas Evans (disambiguation), multiple people
Doug Evans (ice hockey) (born 1963), retired Canadian ice hockey player
Doug Evans (American football) (born 1970), retired American football player
Doug Evans (fighter) (born 1980), American lightweight mixed martial artist
Douglas Evans (actor) (1904–1968), American actor
Douglas Evans (children's author) (born 1953), American author
Dudley Evans (1886–1972), English cricketer
Duncan Evans (born 1959), Welsh golfer
Dwayne Evans (born 1958), American Olympic sprinter
Dwight Evans (born 1951), American baseball player
Dwight E. Evans (born 1954), American congressman
Dylan Evans (born 1966), British academic and author

E
E. Everett Evans (1893–1958), American sci–fi author
E. E. Evans-Pritchard (1902–1973), English anthropologist
Ean Evans (1960–2009), American musician
Earl Evans (American football) (1900–1991), American football player
Earl Evans (scientist) (1910–1999), chairman of the biochemistry department at the University of Chicago
Earl Evans (basketball) (1955–2012), American basketball player
Edgar Evans (1876–1912), Welsh Polar explorer
Edgar Evans (tenor) (1912–2007), Welsh opera singer
Edith Evans (1888–1976), English actress
Edmund Evans (1826–1905), English wood engraver and colour printer
Edward Evans (disambiguation), multiple people
Edward Evans (divine) (fl. 1615) English devine
Edward Evans (poet)  (1716–1798), Welsh poet
Edward Evans (printseller) (1789–1835) British printseller and compositor
Edward Payson Evans (1831–1917), American historian and linguist
Edward B. Evans (1846–1922), British philatelist and army officer
Edward Evans, 1st Baron Mountevans (1880–1957), British naval officer and Antarctic explorer
Edward Evans (politician) (1883–1960), British Labour Party politician
Edward Evans (actor) (1914–2001), British actor
Edwin Evans (cricketer) (1849–1921), Australian cricketer
Edwin Evans (artist) (1860–1946), American painter from Utah
Edwin Evans (music critic) (1874–1945), English music critic
Eleanor Evans (1893–1969), Welsh actress, singer and stage director
Elease Evans (born 1943), American politician in New Jersey
Elfyn Evans (born 1988), Welsh rally driver
Elle Evans (born 1989), American model and actress
Elliot Evans (born 1995), English pop singer
 Ellis Humphrey Evans (1887–1917), Welsh poet who wrote under the bardic name Hedd Wyn
Ellis Evans (1930–2013), Welsh academic
Emanuel J. Evans, longest-serving mayor in Durham, North Carolina history (1951–1963)
Emrys Evans (1891/2–1966), Welsh classicist and university principal
Emyr Estyn Evans (1905–1989), Welsh geographer and archaeologist
Enid Evans (1914–2011), New Zealand librarian
Eric Evans (disambiguation), multiple people
Eric Evans (Welsh Rugby Union) (1894–1955), Wales rugby union footballer and administrator
Eric Evans (rugby union, born 1921) (1921–1991), English rugby union footballer
Eric Evans (priest, born 1928) (1928–1996), Anglican priest and Dean of St Paul's (London)
Eric J. Evans (fl. 1966–2011), British academic and historian
Eric Evans (canoer) (born 1950), American competitive canoer
Erin M. Evans, American fantasy author
Erma-Gene Evans (born 1984), Saint Lucian Olympic javelin thrower
Ernest Evans (cricketer) (1861–1948), English cricketer who played for Somerset
Ernest Evans (politician) (1885–1965), Welsh politician
Ernest E. Evans (1908–1944), officer of the United States Navy in WWII
Evan Evans (disambiguation), multiple people
Evan Evans (poet) (1731–1789), Welsh poet and antiquary
Evan Evans (minister) (1804–1886), Welsh dissenting minister
Evan Evans (academic) (1813–1891), Master of Pembroke College, Oxford and Vice-Chancellor of the University of Oxford
Evan W. Evans, Welsh-born American Wisconsin State Assemblyman
Evan Herber Evans (1836–1896), Welsh Nonconformist minister
Evan Alfred Evans (1876–1948), United States federal judge
Evan Evans (racing driver) (born 1965), off-road champion racing in Championship Off-Road Racing
Evan Evans (film composer) (born 1975), American film score composer
Evans Evans (born 1936), American actress

F
Faith Evans (U.S. Marshal), American state legislator in Hawaii
Faith Evans (born 1973), American singer-songwriter
Felix Evans (1910–1993), American baseball player
Florrie Evans (1884–1967), Welsh revivalist and missionary
Sir Francis Evans, 1st Baronet (1840–1907), British MP for Southampton 1888–1895, 1896–1900 and Maidstone 1901–1906
Francis Thomas Evans, Sr. (1886–1974), pioneer aviator
Francis Evans (diplomat) (1897–1983), British ambassador to Israel and to Argentina
Francis C. Evans (1914–2002), American zoologist and ecologist
Frank Evans (disambiguation), multiple people
Frank Evans (general) (1876–1941), American Marine Corps Brigadier General
Frank Evans (actor) (fl. 1908–1927), American silent film actor
Frank Evans (rugby) (1897–1972), dual-code rugby player
Thomas David Frank Evans (1917–1996), known as Frank Evans, prisoner of war in World War II and author
Frank Evans (baseball) (1921–2012), Negro league baseball player
Frank Evans (politician) (1923–2010), U.S. Representative from Colorado
Frank Evans (bullfighter) (born 1942), British-born bullfighter
Fred and Frederick Evans (disambiguation), multiple people
Fred Evans (union worker) (1881–1912), Australian unionist who died in the Waihi miners' strike of 1912
Fred Evans (comedian) (1889–1951), British music hall and silent movie comedian
Fred Evans (running back) (1921–2007), American football player for the Chicago Bears
Fred Evans (philosopher) (born 1944) American continental philosopher
Fred Evans (defensive tackle) (Frederick H. Evans, born 1983), American football player
Fred Evans (boxer) (born 1991), Welsh amateur boxer
Frederick John Owen Evans (1815–1885), Royal Navy officer and hydrographer
Frederick H. Evans (1853–1943), British photographer, primarily of architectural subjects

G
Gabe Evans, American politician from Colorado
Garan Evans (born 1973), Welsh rugby union footballer
Gareth Evans (disambiguation), multiple people
Gareth Evans (politician) (born 1944), Australian former politician & former head of the International Crisis Group
Gareth Evans (philosopher) (1946–1980), philosopher at Oxford University and student of Michael Dummett
Gareth Evans (rugby union, born 1952), Welsh former rugby union player
Gareth Evans (footballer, born 1967), English former professional footballer
Gareth Evans (director) (born 1980), Welsh film director based in Indonesia
Gareth Evans (footballer, born 1981), English former professional footballer
Gareth Evans (weightlifter) (born 1986), British weightlifter
Gareth Evans (footballer, born 1987), Welsh professional footballer
Gareth Evans (footballer, born 1988), English professional footballer
Gareth Evans (English rugby player) (born 1991), English rugby union player
Gareth Evans (New Zealand rugby player) (born 1991), New Zealand rugby union player
Gary Evans (serial killer) (1954–1998), American serial killer
Gary Evans (racing driver) (born 1960), British former racing driver
Gary Evans (golfer) (born 1969), English golfer
Gavin Evans (born 1984), Welsh rugby union player
Gaulbert Evans (born 1965), cricketer for the United States Virgin Islands
Gene Evans (1922–1988), American actor
Gene Evans (pyrotechnician) (1937–2008), American pyrotechnician
Gerard Evans (died 1979), Irishman supposedly executed by the IRA
Geoff and Geoffrey Evans (disambiguation), multiple people
Geoff Evans (cricketer) (born 1939), English cricketer
Geoff Evans (rugby union born 1942), former Wales international rugby union player
Geoff Evans (rugby union born 1950), former England international rugby union player
Geoff Evans (political scientist), British political scientist
Geoffrey Evans (botanist) (1883–1963), British botanist
Geoffrey Charles Evans (1901–1987), British World War II general
Geoffrey Evans (c. 1943 – 2012), Irish serial killer
George Evans (disambiguation), multiple people
George Evans (antiquary) (1630?–1702), English antiquary
George Evans, 1st Baron Carbery (c. 1680 – 1749), Irish politician
George Evans, 4th Baron Carbery (1766–1804), British politician
George Evans (explorer) (1780–1852), Australian explorer
 Sir George De Lacy Evans (1787–1870), British Army general
George Evans (American politician) (1797–1867), American congressman
George Evans (Australian politician) (1802–1868), politician in Victoria, Australia
George Henry Evans (1805–1855), American radical reformer
George Hampden Evans (died 1842), Irish politician
George S. Evans (1826–1883), Texas Ranger, miner, businessman and political official
George Essex Evans (1863–1909), Australian journalist
George Evans (footballer, born 1864) (1864–1947), English football player (Manchester United)
George "Honey Boy" Evans (1870–1915), American songwriter and entertainer
George Evans (VC) (1876–1937), British Army officer
George Evans (coach) (1901–1976), American football, basketball, and baseball coach
George Evans (bandleader) (died 1993), English jazz bandleader, arranger and tenor saxophonist
George Ewart Evans (1909–1988), Welsh-born schoolteacher, writer and folklorist
George Evans (cartoonist) (1920–2001), comic book artist
George Roche Evans (1922–1985), American Catholic bishop
George Evans (footballer, born 1935) (1935–2000), Welsh footballer
George Evans (rugby league) (1941–2015), Australian rugby league footballer
George Evans (singer) (born 1963), Canadian-American jazz vocalist
George Evans (basketball) (born 1971), American basketballer
George Evans (footballer, born 1994), English football player (Manchester City, Crewe Alexandra)
Geraint Evans (1922–1992), Welsh opera singer
Geri Evans (1940–2018), American politician
Gil Evans (1912–1988), Canadian jazz musician
Gillian Evans, British philosopher
Glen Evans (1936–2016), New Zealand politician
Godfrey Evans (1920–1999), English cricketer (Kent)
Graeme Evans (born 1942), Zimbabwean cricket umpire
Graham Evans (born 1963), British Conservative politician
Graham Evans (public servant) (born 1943), Australian public servant and policy maker
Grant Evans (scholar) (1948–2014), Australian anthropologist
Grant Evans (born 1990), Scottish footballer
Greg Evans (disambiguation), multiple people
Greg Evans (cartoonist) (born 1947), American cartoonist
Greg Evans (television host) (born 1953), Australian television host
Greg Evans (American football) (born 1971), professional American football player
Gregory Evans (1913–2010), Canadian judge
Gregory Evans (dramatist), British radio and television playwright
Griffith Evans (politician) (1869–1943), Australian politician
Griffith Conrad Evans (1887–1973), American mathematician
Gurney Evans (1907–1987), politician in Manitoba, Canada
Guy Evans (born 1947), English drummer, percussionist and composer
Gwyn Evans (rugby union) (born 1957), Welsh rugby union player
Gwyndaf Evans (born 1959), Welsh rally driver
Gwynfor Evans (1912–2005), Welsh politician
Gwynn Evans (1915–2001), Welsh cricketer
Gwynne Evans (1880–1965), American swimmer and water polo player
Gwynne Owen Evans British criminal hanged for the murder of John Alan West
Gyan Evans (born c. 1960), Australian singer-songwriter

H
Harold Evans (footballer) (1889–1973), Australian rules footballer
Harold Evans (attorney), UN appointed administrator of Jerusalem in 1948
Harold Evans (1928–2020), British American journalist, former editor of Sunday Times and campaigner
Harry Evans (disambiguation), multiple people
Harry Congreve Evans (1860–1899), South Australian journalist and editor
Harry Evans (composer) (1873–1914), Welsh composer
Harry Marshall Erskine Evans (1876–1973), Canadian politician and former mayor of Edmonton, Alberta
Harry Evans (Australian footballer) (1879–?), Australian rules footballer
Harry Evans (football manager), British football coach and former manager of Blackpool F.C. (1928–33)
Harry Evans (footballer, born 1919) (1919–1962), English football player and manager
Harry Evans (Australian Senate clerk) (1946–2014), Clerk of the Australian Senate
Heath Evans (born 1978), American football fullback
Henry Evans (disambiguation), multiple people
Henry Evans (theatre) (fl. 1583–1608), Elizabethan theatrical producer
Henry Evans (Evanion) (1832–1905), conjurer, ventriloquist and humorist
Henry H. Evans (1836–1917), American politician from Illinois
Henry Clay Evans (1843–1921), American politician and businessman
Henry Evans (English cricketer) (1857–1920), English cricketer
Henry R. Evans (1861–1949), American writer and amateur magician
Henry Evans (RFC officer) (1879–1916), British aviator and flying ace
Henry James Evans (1912–1990), Australian geologist, discoverer of the Weipa bauxite deposits in 1955
Herbert and Herbie Evans (disambiguation), multiple people
Herbert Evans (politician) (1868–1931), British Labour Party Member of Parliament for Gateshead 1931
Herbert Evans (actor) (1882–1952), British-born American film actor
Herbert McLean Evans (1882–1971), American anatomist and embryologist
Herbie Evans (1894–1982), former Welsh footballer
Heshimu Evans (born 1975), American-born Portuguese basketball player
Hiram Kinsman Evans (1863–1941), U.S. Representative from Iowa
Hiram Wesley Evans (1881–1966), Imperial Wizard of the "second" Ku Klux Klan
Horace Evans, 1st Baron Evans (1903–1963), Welsh physician to the Royal Family
Howard Evans (journalist) (1839–1915), British Radical and Nonconformist journalist
Howard Ensign Evans (1919–2002), American entomologist
Howard Evans (musician) (1944–2006), British trumpeter
Hugh Evans (footballer) (1919–2010), Welsh footballer active in the 1940s and 1950s
Hugh Evans (basketball), American basketball referee active from 1972 to 2001
Hugh Evans (humanitarian) (born 1983), Australian humanitarian
Hywel Evans (figure skater) (born 1945), British Olympic figure skater

I
Iain Evans (born 1960), politician
Iain Evans (field hockey) (born 1981), South African field hockey player
Ian Evans (historian) (born 1940), Australian author, publisher and historian
Ian Evans (footballer) (born 1952), Welsh footballer
Ian Evans (cricketer) (born 1982), English cricketer
Ian Evans (rugby player) (born 1984), Welsh rugby union player
Ianto Evans, Welsh applied ecologist and landscape architect
Ieuan Evans (born 1964), Welsh international rugby union footballer and British Lion
Ifan Evans (born 1983), Welsh rugby union footballer
Ifor Evans, Baron Evans of Hungershall (1899–1982), British academic
Indiana Evans (born 1990), Australian singer-songwriter and actress
Ioan Evans (disambiguation), multiple people 
Ira Hobart Evans (1844–1922), American officer in the Union Army, businessman and philanthropist
Iris Evans (born 1941), Canadian politician in Alberta
Isaac Newton Evans (1827–1901), American Republican Congressman from Pennsylvania
Islwyn Evans, Welsh rugby union international
Ivor Evans (footballer, born 1966), Fijian football midfielder
Ivor Evans (Australian footballer) (1887–1960), Australian rules footballer
Ivor Parry Evans (1923–2009), United States Air Force officer
I. H. N. Evans (Ivor Hugh Norman Evans, 1886–1957), British anthropologist, ethnographer and archaeologist

J
Jack Evans (disambiguation), multiple people
Jack Evans (rugby player) (1871–1924), Welsh rugby union and rugby league footballer who played in the 1890s 
Jack Evans (footballer, born 1889) (1889–1971), Welsh international footballer
Jack Evans (footballer, born 1891) (1891–1988), Australian rules footballer for Melbourne
Jack Elwyn Evans (1897–1941), Welsh rugby union and rugby league footballer who played in the 1920s
Jack Evans (American football) (1905–1980), American football player
Jack Evans (footballer, born 1908) (1908–1960), Australian rules footballer
Jack Evans (rugby), Welsh rugby union, and rugby league footballer who played in the 1940s and 1950s
Jack Wilson Evans (1922–1997), mayor of Dallas, Texas, 1981–1983
Jack Evans (ice hockey) (1928–1996), Canadian ice hockey player and coach in the National Hockey League
Jack Evans (Australian politician) (1928–2009), Australian Senator
Jack Evans (footballer, born 1930), Australian rules footballer for St Kilda
Jack Evans (D.C. politician) (born 1953), member of the Council of the District of Columbia
Jack Evans (musician) (born 1953), Reverend Zen drummer and composer
Jack Evans (born 1982), American professional wrestler
Jack Evans (footballer, born 1993), English footballer
Jahri Evans (born 1983), American football player
Jake Evans (baseball) (1856–1907), Major League Baseball right fielder
Jake Evans (footballer) (born 1998), English footballer
Jake Evans (ice hockey) (born 1996), Canadian ice hockey player
James Evans (disambiguation), multiple people
James Evans (linguist) (1801–1846), Canadian missionary
James G. Evans (1809–1859), American painter
James La Fayette Evans (1825–1903), American politician from Indiana
James R. Evans (1845–1918), American Civil War soldier and Medal of Honor recipient
James Evans (Ontario politician) (1848–1880), Canadian politician
James Evans (cricketer) (1891–1973), English cricketer
James Evans (Utah politician), Chairman of the Utah Republican Party
James Evans (rugby league) (born 1978), Australian rugby league player, Wales international
Jane Evans (feminist) (1907–2004), American Jewish activist
Jane Evans (artist) (1946–2012), New Zealand artist
Janet Evans (born 1971), American swimmer
Jan Evans (1937–2000), American politician
Jason Evans (disambiguation), multiple people
Jaxon Evans (born 1996), New Zealand racing driver
Jeff Evans (cricket) (born 1954), Welsh cricket umpire
Jeff Evans (born 1960), British writer and journalist
Jeffrey Richard de Corban Evans (born 1948), British shipbroker and hereditary peer
Jeffrey Evans, American musician
Jem Evans (1867–1942), Welsh rugby union international
Jennifer Evans, Welsh actress
Jeremy Evans (born 1987), American basketball player
Jerome Evans (football coach) (c. 1930 – 1995), US American football coach
Jerome Evans (singer) (1938–2003), American singer
Jerome Albert Evans, Jr. (Silkski), American producer and rap artist
Jerry Evans (born 1968), US American footballer (Denver Broncos)
Jesse Evans (outlaw) (1853–????), American outlaw
Jessie Evans (basketball), American college basketball coach
Jessie Evans (singer), American-born songwriter, singer, saxophonist and record producer in Germany
Jill Evans (born 1959), Welsh politician
Jim and Jimmy Evans (disambiguation), multiple people
Jim Evans (umpire) (born 1946), baseball umpire
Jim Evans (politician) (born 1948), Congressional candidate from Missouri
Jim Evans (artist) (born 1950), American painter
Jim Evans (rugby union) (born 1980), English rugby union player
Jimmy Evans (footballer, born 1894) (1894–1975), Welsh international footballer
Jo Evans, American softball player and coach
Joan Evans (art historian) (1893–1977), British art historian
Joan Evans (charity worker) (born 1931), Australian religious sister and charity activist 
Joan Evans (actress) (born 1934), American film actress
Joanne Evans, New Zealand footballer
Jodie Evans (born 1954), American political activist
Joe Evans (1895–1951), American baseball player
Joe Evans (musician) (1916–2014), American jazz alto saxophonist
John and Johnny Evans (disambiguation), multiple people
John Evans (by 1519–67/69), English politician from Leominster
John Evans (bishop) (before 1671–1724), Welsh born bishop of Bangor and bishop of Meath
John Evans (Pennsylvania governor) (c. 1678–after 1709), Welsh-born colonial governor of Pennsylvania
John Evans (divine) (c. 1680 – 1730), Welsh divine and writer
John Evans (pirate) (died c. 1723), Welsh pirate
John Evans (actor) (c. 1693 – c. 1734), actor, who confined his performances to Ireland
John Evans (1702–1782), Welsh anti-Methodist Anglican priest
John Evans (died 1779), Welsh Anglican priest and curate of Portsmouth
John Evans (surgeon) (1756–1846), Welsh surgeon and cartographer
John Evans (Baptist) (1767–1827), Welsh minister
John Evans (topographical writer) (1768 – c. 1812), writer on Wales
John Evans (explorer) (1770–1799), Welsh explorer of the Missouri River
John Evans (19th-century writer) (died 1832), English writer
John Evans (printer) (1774–1828), English printer
John Evans (Methodist) (1779–1847), Welsh Methodist of Llwynffortun 
John Evans (Kent cricketer) (fl. 1820s), English cricketer
John Evans or I. D. Ffraid (1814–1875), Welsh poet
John Evans (governor) (1814–1897), American politician, governor of Colorado Territory
John Evans (British Columbia politician) (1816–1879), Canadian miner and politician in British Columbia
John M. Evans (Wisconsin politician) (1820–1903), American physician and politician from Wisconsin
John Evans (archaeologist) (1823–1908), English archaeologist and geologist
John Newell Evans (1846–1944), Welsh-born Canadian politician from British Columbia
John Gwenogvryn Evans (1852–1930), Welsh minister and paleographer
John Evans (Australian politician) (1855–1943), Australian politician in Tasmania
John William Evans (geologist) (1857–1930), British geologist
John Gary Evans (1863–1942), American politician, governor of South Carolina
John M. Evans (1863–1946), American politician from Montana
John Evans (Saskatchewan politician) (1867–1958), Welsh-born Canadian politician from Saskatchewan
John Edward "Ted" Evans (1868–1942), English footballer with Stoke and Port Vale
John Henry Evans (1872–1947), American Mormon educator and writer
John William Evans (rugby player) (1875–1947), Welsh rugby union forward
John Evans (Ogmore MP) (1875–1961), Welsh politician from Ogmore
John Cayo Evans (1879–1958), Welsh mathematician and academic
John Hart Evans (1881–1959), Welsh rugby union centre
John Evans (cricketer, born 1889) (1889–1960), English cricketer
John Evans (footballer, born 1900) (1900–????), English footballer for Sheffield United, Walsall and Stoke
John Evans (rugby league), known as Jack, English rugby league footballer who played in the 1920s
St John Evans (1905–1956), Anglican cleric in Africa
John Wainwright Evans (1909–1999), solar astronomer 
John Evans (rugby player) (1911–1943), Welsh international rugby union hooker
John C. Evans (fl. 1930–1965), American football and basketball player and coach
John Davies Evans (1925–2011), English archaeologist and academic
John Evans (Idaho governor) (1925–2014), American politician, governor of Idaho
John Evans (footballer, born 1929) (1929–2004), English footballer with Liverpool
John Robert Evans (1929–2015), Canadian pediatrician, academic, businessperson, and civic leader
John Rhys Evans (1930–2010), Welsh operatic baritone
John Evans, Baron Evans of Parkside (1930–2016), United Kingdom politician
John Leslie Evans (born 1941), Canadian politician from Ontario
John Evans (footballer, born 1941), footballer for Chester City
John Maxwell Evans (born 1942), Canadian judge
John D. Evans, American business executive and philanthropist
John Evans (special effects), Visual effects artist on 5 James Bond films
John Evans (bowls) (born 1947), English footballer and bowls player
John Evan or Evans (born 1948), English musician with Jethro Tull
John Evans (canoer) (born 1949), American slalom canoer
John Louis Evans (1950–1983), American murderer executed in 1983
John Evans (Gaelic football), Irish Gaelic football manager
John Paul Evans (born 1954), Canadian ice hockey player
John Evans (Gaelic footballer) (born 1955), Irish Gaelic footballer
John R. Evans (born 1955), American politician from Pennsylvania
John Marshall Evans (born 1948), American ambassador to Armenia
J. Michael Evans (born 1954), Canadian
John Evans (Box Tops) (born before 1963), American musician with the Box Tops
John Bryan Evans (born 1980), Welsh filmmaker
Johnny Evans (Canadian football) (before 1902–1930), Canadian football player
Johnny Evans (American football) (born 1956), American football player and radio commentator 
Jon Evans (born 1974), Canadian novelist and journalist
Jonathan Evans (disambiguation), multiple people
Jonathan Evans (politician) (born 1950), British lawyer and Conservative Party Member of Parliament
Jonathan Evans, Baron Evans of Weardale (born 1958), British; Director-General of MI5
Jonathan Evans (American football) (born 1981), US American footballer
Jonathan Evans (rugby player) (born 1992), Welsh rugby union player
Joni Evans (born 1942), American book publisher
Jonny Evans (born 1988), Northern Irish footballer with Manchester United
Jordan Evans (disambiguation), multiple people
Josh Evans (film producer) (born 1971), American film producer
Josh Evans (defensive lineman) (born 1972), former American football player
Josh Ryan Evans (1982–2002), American actor
Josh Evans (defensive back) (born 1991), US American football player
Joshua Evans (Quaker minister) (1731–1798), Quaker minister from New Jersey
Joshua Evans, Jr. (1777–1846), United States Congressman from Pennsylvania
Josiah J. Evans (1786–1858), United States Senator from South Carolina
Josiah Evans (1820–1873), British engineer
Joyce Evans (photographer) (1929–2019), Australian artist
Joyce Evans, American news anchor and reporter
Judi Evans (born 1964), American actress
Julian Evans (born 1972), British adventurer and charity fund-raiser
Juliana Evans (born 1989), Malaysian actress
Justin Evans (born 1977), American soccer player
Justin Evans (American football) (born 1995), American football player

K
Kane Evans (born 1992), Australian rugby league footballer, Fijian international
Karen S. Evans, American bureaucrat
Kate Williams Evans (1866-1961), suffragette and activist for women's rights
Kathryn Evans (born 1952), British stage actress
Kathryn Evans (born 1981), English swimmer
Kathy Evans (1948–2003), English journalist and women's right activist
Keenan Evans (born 1996), American basketball player in the Israel Basketball Premier League
Kelly Evans (born 1985), American journalist
Kellylee Evans (born 1975), Canadian jazz and soul vocalist
Kenneth A. Evans (1898–1970), American Republican businessman and politician
Kenneth Evans (bishop of Ontario) (1903–1970)
Kenneth Evans (bishop of Dorking) (1915–2007)
Kenny Evans (born 1979), American high jumper
Kevin L. Evans (born 1962), French-born American entertainment executive 
Kevin Evans (cricketer) (born 1963), former English cricketer
Kevin Evans (ice hockey) (born 1965), Canadian ice hockey player
Kieran Evans (born 1969), Welsh film director and screenwriter
 Kenadie Evans (born 2008), American Golfer

L
Sir Laming Worthington-Evans, 1st Baronet (1868–1931), British Conservative politician
Larry Evans, multiple people
Laura Evans, Welsh actress
Lauren Evans (born 1983), American singer and songwriter
Laurie Evans (politician) (1933–2016), Canadian politician in Manitoba
Laurie Evans (cricketer) (born 1987), English cricketer
Lawrence C. Evans (born 1949), American mathematician
Lawrence Watt-Evans (born 1954), American sci-fi and fantasy author
Lee Evans (disambiguation), multiple people
Lee Evans (athlete) (1947–2021), American sprinter
Lee Evans (politician) (born c. 1962), Australian politician
Lee Evans (comedian) (born 1964), English comedian and actor
Lee Latchford-Evans (born 1975), musician and former member of the band Steps
Lee Evans (American football) (born 1981), American football player
Lee Evans (footballer) (born 1994), Welsh association football player with Wolverhampton Wanderers
Lee G. R. Evans, British birdwatcher
Len Evans (footballer) (1903–1977), Welsh international football goalkeeper
Len Evans (wine) (1930–2006), Australian wine columnist
Leomont Evans (born 1974), American football safety
Leonard Evans (1929–2016), Canadian politician in Manitoba
Lewis Evans (disambiguation), multiple people
Lewis Evans (controversialist) (fl. 1574), Welsh controversialist
Lewis Evans (surveyor) (c. 1700 – 1756), Welsh colonial surveyor and geographer
Lewis Evans (mathematician) (1755–1827), Welsh mathematician
Lewis Evans (collector) (1853–1930), British businessman and scientific instrument collector
Lewis Pugh Evans (1881–1962), British Brigadier General and World War I Victoria Cross recipient
Lewis Evans (bishop) (1904–1996), Anglican bishop of Barbados
Lewis Evans (rugby player) (born 1987), Welsh rugby union player
Lila Walter Evans, American politician in Montana
Lillian Evanti (1890–1967), American opera singer
Linda Evans (disambiguation), multiple people
Linda Evans (born 1942), American actress
Linda Evans (U.S. radical) (born 1947), activist
Linda Evans (author) (born 1958), American science fiction writer
Lini Evans, Canadian singer and actress 
Lisa Evans (born 1992), Scottish footballer
Lissa Evans, British television director, producer and author
Lizzie Evans, American entertainer
Lizzie P. Evans-Hansell (1836–1922), American writer
Lloyd Evans (disambiguation), multiple people
Llŷr Ifans (born 1968), Welsh actor
Lon Evans (1911–1992), US American footballer (Green Bay Packers)
Lorenzo Evans (1878–????), footballer in the northwest of England
Louis E. Atkinson (1841–1910), American physician, attorney and Republican politician
Lucia Evans (born 1982), Irish–Zimbabwean singer
Lucy Evans (born 1985), British actress
Luke Evans (actor) (born 1979), Welsh actor
Luke Evans (cricketer) (born 1987), English cricketer
Luke Evans (rugby union) (born 1988), Australian rugby union player
Luther H. Evans (1902–1981), American political scientist
Lyn Evans (born 1945), Welsh scientist (CERN)
Lynne Evans (born 1948), British archer

M
Mac Evans (1884–1974), Australian cricketer and footballer (soccer)
Maddy Evans (born 1991), American soccer player
Madge Evans (1909–1981), American actress
Mal and Malcolm Evans (disambiguation), multiple people
Mal Evans (1935–1976), road manager for 'The Beatles'
Malcolm Evans (computer programmer) (born 1944), British computer programmer
Malcolm Evans (cartoonist) (born 1945), New Zealand cartoonist
Malcolm Evans (jurist) (born 1959), O.B.E., British jurist
Maldwyn Evans (1937–2009), Welsh bowls player
Marc Evans (born 1963), Welsh film director
Marcus Evans (born 1963), a British businessman, owner of Ipswich Town F.C.
Marcus C. Evans, Jr., American congressman from Illinois
Margaret Evans (journalist), Canadian journalist
Margaret Evans Price, née Margaret Evans (1888–1973) American children's book illustrator and artist
Margaret Evans (novelist), pseudonym used by British writer Margaret Potter (1921–1998)
Margaret Evans (mayor), mayor of Hamilton, New Zealand, 1989–1998
Margie Evans (1939–2021), American blues and gospel singer and songwriter
Mari Evans (1919–2017), American poet
Marion Evans (born 1935), Welsh historian
Marjorie Evans (c.1850–1907), Scottish artist
Mark Evans (disambiguation), multiple people
Mark Evans Austad, aka Mark Evans, (1917–1988) American T.V. commentator and U.S. Ambassador to Finland and Norway
Mark Evans (general) (born 1953), Lieutenant General in the Australian Army
Mark Evans (musician) (born 1956), Australian bass guitar player with AC/DC and other Australian rock bands
Mark Evans (rower) (born 1957), Canadian rower
Mark Evans (actor) (born 1985), Welsh actor
Mark Evans (rugby union), English rugby player
Mark Evans (TV presenter), TV presenter and veterinary surgeon
Mark Evans (footballer, born 1970), English professional footballer
Mark Evans (comedian), UK comedian and comedy writer
Marlon Evans (born 1997), Guamanian footballer
Marsha J. Evans (born 1947), American Rear Admiral
Martin Evans (model engineer) (1916–2003), British magazine editor
Martin Evans (born 1941), British scientist, 2007 Nobel Prize winner in Physiology or Medicine
Martyn Evans (born 1953), Australian politician
Martyn Evans (academic), Professor in Humanities in Medicine at the University of Durham
Mary Evans (1770–1843), English; Samuel Taylor Coleridge's first love
Mary Anne Evans (1792–1872), wife of Disraeli
Mary Ann Evans (1819–1880), better known as George Eliot, writer
 Mary Ann Evans (1908–1996), better known as Fearless Nadia, Indian actress and stuntwoman
Mary Beth Evans (born 1961), American actress
Mary Forbes Evans (1936–2010), British writer and picture librarian
Mary Evans (artist) (born 1963), British-Nigerian artist
Mary Evans Wilson (1866–1928), American civil rights activist
Mathew Evans, Canadian inventor
Matilda Evans (1872–1935), African–American doctor and health campaigner
Matt Evans (born 1986), Filipino actor
Matt Evans (rugby union) (born 1988), Canadian rugby union footballer
Matthew Evans, Baron Evans of Temple Guiting (1941–2016), British Labour Party politician
Matthew Rhys (born 1974), stage name used by Welsh actor born Matthew Evans
Maureen Evans (born 1940), Welsh pop singer
Maurice Evans (actor) (1901–1989), English actor
Maurice Evans (footballer, born 1936) (1936–2000), British football player and manager
Maurice Evans (basketball) (born 1978), American basketball player
Maurice Evans (American football) (born 1988), American football defensive end 
Max Evans (Australian footballer) (1923–2006), Australian rules footballer
Max Evans (politician) (1930–2019), Australian politician
Max Evans (rugby union) (born 1983), Scottish international rugby union rugby player
Maxine Evans (born 1966), Welsh actress
Maya Evans (born 1979), British peace campaigner
Medwyn Evans (born 1964), Welsh footballer
Melvin H. Evans (1917–1984), Governor of the United States Virgin Islands and ambassador to Trinidad and Tobago
Meredith Evans, Australian paralympic swimmer
Meredith Gwynne Evans (1904–1952), British physical chemist
Merle Evans (1891–1987), American cornet player and circus band conductor
Micah Evans (born 1993), English footballer
Michael, Mickey, Micky and Mike Evans (disambiguation), multiple people
Michael Evans (actor) (1920–2007), original cast member of Gigi
Michael Evans (photographer) (1944–2005), presidential photographer
Michael Charles Evans (1951–2011), Roman Catholic bishop of East Anglia, England
Michael Evans (rower) (born 1957), Canadian Olympic rower
Michael Evans (water polo) (born 1960), American Olympic water polo player
Michael Evans (Dutch footballer) (born 1976), Dutch footballer
Michael Evans (boxer) (born 1977), American lightweight boxer
Michael Evans (Australian footballer) (born 1992), Australian rules footballer
Michael H. Evans, CEO and co-founder of The Vines of Mendoza
Mickey Evans (Welsh footballer) (born 1947), Welsh footballer
Mickey Evans (footballer born 1973), British footballer, played for Plymouth Argyle and Southampton
Micky Evans (born 1946), English footballer
Mike Ronay Evans (born 1959), American heavyweight boxer
Mike Evans (offensive lineman) (born 1946), American football offensive lineman
Mike Evans (journalist) (born 1947), American political author
Mike Evans (actor) (1949–2006), American actor on The Jeffersons, co-creator of Good Times
Mike Evans (basketball) (born 1955), retired NBA player and current coach
Mike Evans (wide receiver) (born 1993), American football wide receiver
Mitch Evans (born 1994), New Zealand racing driver
Monica Evans (born 1940), English actress
Monique Evans (born 1956), Brazilian model, actress and TV presenter
Monique Evans (Miss Texas) (born 1993), American beauty pageant title-holder
Cowboy Morgan Evans (1903–1969), American rodeo performer
Morgan "Bill" Evans (1910–2002), American landscape designer
Moss Evans Welsh trade unionist
M. Stanton Evans, American political conservative commentator and author

N
Nancy Evans (table tennis) (1903–1998), Welsh table tennis player
Nancy Evans (opera singer) (1915–2000), British opera singer (mezzo-soprano)
Nathan Evans (Ohio politician) (1804–1879), American politician
Nathan George Evans (1824–1868), American Civil War Confederate general
Neal Evans (c. 1888 – 1945), US-born pioneer freightman, entrepreneur cowboy, and miner in British Columbia, Canada
Neil Evans (footballer) (born 1947), Australian rules footballer from Victoria
Neil Evans (presenter), Australian Fox Sports television presenter
Nerys Evans (born 1980), Welsh politician
Nicholas, Nick and Nicky Evans (disambiguation), multiple people
Nicholas Evans (1950–2022), English screenwriter and journalist
Nicholas Evans (linguist) (born 1956), Australian linguist specializing in Indigenous Australian languages
Nick Evans (trombonist) (born 1947), British jazz trombonist of e.g. The Keith Tippett Group, Soft Machine
Nick Evans (cricketer) (born 1954), English cricketer
Nick Evans (rugby union) (born 1980), New Zealand rugby union footballer
Nick Evans (baseball) (born 1986), American baseball player
Nicky Evans (footballer) (born 1958), English footballer
Nicky Evans (born 1979), British actor
Nigel Evans (born 1957), British politician
Niki Evans (born 1972), English singer
Noel Evans (footballer) (born 1930), Australian rules footballer
Noel Evans (cricketer) (1911–1964), English cricketer
Non Evans (born 1974), Welsh sportswoman
Noreen Evans (born 1955), American politician in California
Norm Evans (born 1942), American football offensive tackle
Norman Evans (1901–1962), English variety and radio performer
Norman Evans (architect), British architect

O
Oliver Evans (1755–1819), American inventor and engineer
Omar Evans (born 1976), American Canadian football defensive back
Orinda Dale Evans (born 1943), American Federal Judge
Orrin Evans (born 1976), American jazz pianist
Orrin C. Evans (1902–1971), African-American journalist and comic book publisher
Ossie Evans (1916–1986), Welsh footballer
Owen Evans (disambiguation)

P
Pam Evans (born 1953), American marketing executive and author
Pamela Evans (born 1949), British author
Pat Evans (mayor) (born 1943), mayor of Plano, Texas
Patrice Evans (born 1976), American writer and satirist
Patrick Evans (disambiguation), multiple people
Paul Evans (disambiguation), multiple people
Paul R. Evans (1931–1987), American furniture designer
Paul Evans (musician) (born 1938), American rock and roll singer/songwriter from the 1950s
Paul Evans (poet) (1945–1991), British poet
Paul F. Evans, American law enforcement officer who served as Commissioner of the Boston Police Department
Paul Evans (ice hockey, born 1954), Canadian ice hockey player in the NHL who played for the Philadelphia Flyers
Paul Evans (ice hockey, born 1955), Canadian ice hockey player in the NHL who played for the Toronto Maple Leafs
Paul Evans (athlete) (born 1961), British Olympic runner
Paul Evans (footballer, born 1973), South African football player
Paul Evans (footballer, born 1974), Welsh football player
Paul Evans (Australian footballer) (born 1978), Port Adelaide AFL footballer
Paul Evans (basketball), American college basketball coach
Paul Evans (football assistant manager), English football assistant manager and coach and ex goalkeeper
Paul Evans (Illinois politician), Republican member of the Illinois House of Representatives
Peggy Evans (1921–2015), British actress
Percy Evans (1894–1959), English cricketer
Pete Evans (born 1973), Australian chef, author and TV personality
Peter Evans (disambiguation), multiple people
Peter Evans (restaurateur) (1926–2014), British restaurateur
Peter Evans (radio personality) (1927–1985), 3LO breakfast announcer 1965–1986
Peter Evans (musicologist) (1929–2018), British musicologist, author of The Music of Benjamin Britten
Peter B. Evans (born 1944), political sociologist
Peter Evans (swimmer) (born 1961), Australian swimmer, won a gold medal at the 1980 Summer Olympics
Peter Evans (musician), American musician, specializes in improvisation and avant-garde music
Phil Evans (Australian footballer) (born 1950), Australian rules footballer
Phil Evans (footballer, born 1980) (born 1980), South African football (soccer) player
Philip Evans (1645–1679), Welsh Roman Catholic priest and saint
Philip Evans (headmaster) (born 1948), British educationalist and headmaster
Philip Evans (cricketer) (born 1982), English cricketer
Phillip Evans (baseball) (born 1992), American baseball player
Pippa Evans, British comedian
Polly Evans, British TV presenter

R
Rachel Held Evans (1981–2019), American columnist and author
Ralph Evans (disambiguation), multiple people
Ralph Evans (cricketer) (1891–1929), English first-class cricketer
Ralph Evans (footballer) (1915–1996), English forward in the Football League
Ralph Evans (sailor) (1924–2000), American sailor and Olympic medalist
Ralph Evans (boxer) (born 1953), British Olympic bronze medalist
Ralph Evans (violinist) (born 1953), American violinist in the Fine Arts Quartet
Randall Evans (born 1991), hb football cornerback
Randy Evans (born 1958), American Republican lawyer
Raphale Evans (born 1990), English footballer
Rashaan Evans (born 1996), American football player
Rashad Evans (born 1979), American mixed martial arts fighter
Ray and Raymond Evans (disambiguation), multiple people
Ray Evans (1915–2007), American songwriter
Ray Evans (halfback) (1922–1999), American football halfback
Ray Evans (Australian businessman) (1939–2014), Australian campaigner against climate change mitigation efforts
Ray Evans (cartoonist) (1887–1954), American editorial cartoonist
Ray Evans (footballer, born 1949) (born 1949), retired English footballer
Ray Evans (rugby league), rugby league footballer who played in the 1950s
Raymond Evans (USCG) (c. 1922 – 2013), United States Coast Guard sailor
Raymond Evans (field hockey) (1939–1974), Australian field hockey player
Reanne Evans (born 1985), English snooker player
Rebecca Evans (politician) (born 1976), Welsh politician
Rebecca Evans (singer), Welsh soprano
Red Evans (1906–1982), American baseball pitcher
Redd Evans (1912–1972), American lyricist
Reg Evans (1928–2009), British actor
Reggie Evans (American football) (born 1959), US American footballer
Reggie Evans (born 1980), American basketball player
Reginald Evans (born 1939), footballer for Newcastle United
Rheece Evans (born 1990), South African footballer
Rhodri Evans (born 1989), Welsh cricketer
Rhys Evans (born 1982), English footballer
Rhys Evans (rugby league) (born 1992), Welsh rugby league footballer
Rhys Ifans (born 1967), Welsh actor
Ric Evans (born 1942), Australian cricket umpire
Richard, Richie and Ricky Evans (disambiguation), multiple people
Richard Evans (1778-1864), British colliery owner
Richard Evans (portrait painter) (1784–1871), English portrait-painter and copyist
Richard Evans (1811-1887), son of Richard Evans (1778–1864)
R. C. Evans (1861–1921), Canadian leader in the Reorganized Church of Jesus Christ of Latter Day Saints 
Richard Thomas Evans (1890–1946), British Liberal Party politician
Richard L. Evans (1906–1971), American leader in The Church of Jesus Christ of Latter-day Saints and radio announcer
 Sir Richard Evans (British diplomat) (1928–2012), British diplomat
Richard Evans (actor) (1935–2021), American actor
Richard Bunger Evans (born 1942), American composer
Richard Evans (businessman) (born 1942), English business executive, known as Dick Evans
Richard Evans (designer) (born 1945), English creative artist for record album covers
Richard J. Evans (born 1947),  English historian specialising in Germany before and during World War II
Richard Evans (rugby league), rugby league footballer who played in the 1970s
Richard Evans (Australian politician) (born 1953), Australian Liberal Party politician
Richard Evans (radio presenter) (born 1958), British radio presenter
Richard Paul Evans (born 1962), American author of books with Christian themes
Richard Evans (footballer, born 1968), Welsh footballer
Richard Evans (AI researcher) (born 1969), computer game developer
Richard Evans (footballer, born 1983), Welsh football midfielder
Richard Evans (Canadian composer), Canadian television score and new age composer
Richie Evans (1941–1985), American racecar driver in NASCAR
Ricky Evans (rugby union) (born 1960), Welsh rugby union international
Ricky Evans (darts player) (born 1990), English darts player
Rob and Robert Evans (disambiguation), multiple people
Rob Evans (basketball) (born 1946), American college basketball coach
Rob Evans (Christian musician) (born 1953), children's singer-songwriter known as the Donut Man
Rob Evans (rugby player) (born 1992), Welsh rugby union player
Rob Evans (writer) (born 1978), playwright
Robert Harding Evans (1778–1857), bookseller and auctioneer
Robert Morgan Evans (1783–1844), American politician in Indiana
Robert Evans (Archdeacon of Westmorland) (1789–1866), English Anglican archdeacon and author
Robert Evans (Archdeacon of Cloyne) (1808–1889), Irish Anglican archdeacon
Robert Anderson Evans (died 1901), English executioner, 1873–1875
Robert K. Evans (1852–1926), United States Army officer
Robert E. Evans (1856–1925), Nebraska Republican politician
Robert Evans (footballer, born 1885) (1885–1965), footballer who played for Sheffield United
Robert Evans (racing driver) (1889-?), American racecar driver
Robert B. Evans (1906–1998), industrialist, socialite, sportsman, and Chairman of AMC
Robert Evans (1930–2019), film producer
Robert Evans (astronomer) (1937–2022), amateur supernovae astronomer
Robert John Weston Evans (born 1943), professor of modern history
Robert C. Evans (born 1947), American prelate of the Roman Catholic Church
Robert Evans (London politician) (born 1956), Member of the European Parliament for the Labour and Co-operative Parties
Robert Evans (writer) (born 1977), playwright and actor
Robert Evans (wrestler) (born 1983), Canadian professional wrestler
Robert De Friese Evans American Paralympic athlete
Robin Evans (1944–1993), British architect and historian
Robley D. Evans (admiral) (1846–1912), American naval fleet commander from 1907 to 1908, known as "Fighting Bob"
Rod Evans (born 1947), English singer (Deep Purple)
Rod L. Evans, American philosopher and author
Roddy Evans (1934–2016), Welsh rugby union international and British Lion
Roderick Evans (born 1946), judge of the High Court of England and Wales
Roderick L. Evans, American author, lecturer and Christian apologist
Rodney J. Evans (1948–1969), American Medal of Honour recipient
Roger Evans (disambiguation), multiple people
Ron Evans (1939–2007), Australian rules footballer from Melbourne
Ronald Evans (astronaut) (1933–1990),  NASA astronaut and one of only 24 people to have flown to the Moon
Ronald Evans (rugby league) (1933–2010), rugby league footballer who played in the 1950s and 1960s
Ronald M. Evans (born 1949),  American professor and biologist
Rosser Evans (George Rosser Evans, 1867–?), Wales international rugby union player
Rowland Evans (1921–2001), American journalist
Roy Evans (disambiguation), multiple people
Roy Evans (baseball) (1874–1915), baseball pitcher from 1897 to 1903
Roy Evans (Australian footballer) (1913–1987), Australian rules footballer for Footscray
Roy Evans (actor) (born 1930), British actor
Roy Evans (rugby league), rugby league footballer who played in the 1950s, and 1960s
Roy Evans (footballer, born 1943) (1943–1969), Welsh international footballer who died in a car crash in 1969
Roy Evans (born 1948), English footballer and manager
Roy Evans (professor), Welsh civil engineer and professor
Royston Evans, British footballer in the late 1950s and early '60s
Rupert Evans (cricketer) (born 1954), Jamaican born English cricketer
Rupert Evans (born 1977), English actor
Russell Evans (cricketer) (born 1965), English cricketer and umpire
Ryan Evans (born 1990), American basketball player

S
Sam Evans (Big Brother), a Big Brother 14 contestant from Llanelli, born with 70–80% hearing loss
Samuel B. Evans (1812–1836), Alamo defender
Samuel Evans (VC) (c. 1821 – 1901), Scottish recipient of the Victoria Cross
Samuel Thomas Evans (1859–1918), Welsh politician
Sandy Evans, Australian jazz composer and saxophonist
Sara M. Evans (born 1943), American historian academic
Sara Evans (born 1971), American country music singer
Sarah Lindsay Evans (1816–1898), Australian temperance activist
Satyananda Stokes (1882–1946), American-born Indian; apple grower and freedom fighter
Scott Evans (disambiguation), multiple people
Scott Evans (politician) (born 1965), Democratic politician and former mayor of Atlantic City, New Jersey
Scott Evans (lacrosse) (born 1981), Canadian lacrosse player
Scott Evans (actor) (born 1983), American actor
Scott Evans (Canadian football) (born 1983), Canadian football player
Scott Evans (badminton) (born 1987), Irish badminton player
Seán Evan (born 1948), Irish Gaelic footballer
Sebastian Evans (1830–1909), English journalist and political activist
Seiriol Evans (1894–1984), Anglican dean and author
Serena Evans (born 1959), British actress
Shakiem Evans, American actor
Shane Evans (born 1970), American musician
Shaquelle Evans (born 1991), American football wide receiver
Shaun Evans (born 1980), British actor
Shawn Evans (ice hockey) (born 1965), Canadian ice hockey player and head coach
Shawn Evans (lacrosse) (born 1986), Canadian lacrosse player
Sian Evans (born 1971), Welsh singer-songwriter
Sidney Evans (disambiguation), multiple people
Simon Evans (writer) (1895–1940), Welsh writer
Simon Evans (comedian) (born 1965), English comedian
Simon Evans (racing driver) (born 1990), New Zealand racing driver
Slayton A. Evans, Jr. (1943–2001), American chemist
Slim Evans (1890–1944), Canadian trade unionist leader in Canada and the US
Sophie Evans (actress) (born 1976), Hungarian pornographic actress
Sophie Evans (performer) (born 1993), Welsh singer and talent show contestant
Sophie Evans (magician), English magician
Sonia (singer) (born 1971), English pop singer
Spencer Evans, Welsh footballer in the 1930s
Stacey Evans, American politician in Georgia
Stan Evans (born 1930), Australian politician
Stanley Evans (1898–1970), British Labour politician
Stanley Evans (writer) (born 1931), English-born Canadian writer
Stephen Evans (disambiguation), multiple people
Stephen R. Evans, Malaysian politician, public administrator and author from Borneo
C. Stephen Evans (born 1948), American historian and philosopher
Stephen Evans (diplomat) (born 1950), British High Commissioner to Bangladesh
Stephen Evans (journalist), BBC correspondent in Berlin and Seoul
Stephen Evans (rower) (born 1962), who represented Australia at the 1984 Summer Olympics
Stephen Evans (actor) (born 1970), British actor and writer
Stephen Evans (footballer) (born 1980), Welsh footballer with Llanelli
Steve Evans (baseball) (1885–1943), Major League Baseball player
Steve Evans (rugby league), English rugby league footballer
Steve Evans (footballer, born 1962), Scottish football manager with Rotherham United
Steve Evans (writer) (born 1963), American journalist and film historian
Steve Evans (darts player) (born 1972), Welsh darts player
Steve Evans (field hockey) (born 1976), South African Olympic field hockey player
Steve Evans (footballer, born 1979), Welsh international footballer
Steven Evans (soccer) (born 1991), American soccer player
Steven Neil Evans (born 12 August 1960), Australian-American statistician and mathematician
Stewart Evans (ice hockey) (1908–1996), Canadian ice-hockey player
Stewart Evans (born 1960), English footballer
Stuart Evans (author) (1934–1994), Welsh author and poet
Stuart Evans (born 1963), Welsh rugby union international and rugby league footballer
Sue Evans (born 1951), American musician
Susan E. Evans, British paleontologist and herpetologist
Suzanne Evans (born 1965), English UKIP politician

T
T. Cooper Evans (Thomas Cooper Evans, 1924–2005), U.S. Congressman from Iowa
Tania Evans (born 1967), British singer-songwriter
Tavonia Evans, African-American author, businesswoman, cryptocurrency expert, and educator
Ted Evans (footballer) (1868–1942), English footballer
Ted Evans (public servant) (1941–2020), Australian public servant
Tenniel Evans (1926–2009), British actor
Terence, Terrence and Terry Evans (disambiguation), multiple people
Terence T. Evans, judge on the United States Court of Appeals for the Seventh Circuit
Terrence Evans (1934–2015), American actor
Terry Evans (wrestler) (1911–1999), Canadian freestyle sport wrestler
Terry Evans (musician) (1937–2018), American R&B, blues, and soul singer, guitarist and songwriter
Terry Evans (footballer, born 1965), English professional footballer
Terry Evans (footballer, born 1976), Welsh professional footballer
Terry Evans (baseball) (born 1982), American baseball outfielder
Tesni Evans (born 1992), Welsh squash player
Thom and Thomas Evans (disambiguation), multiple people
Thom Evans (born 1985), Scottish rugby union footballer
Thomas Evans (17th-century poet) (died 1633), English poet
Thomas Evans (bookseller) (1739–1803), Welsh bookseller
Thomas Evans (congressman) (c. 1755 – 1815), American politician, U.S. Congressman from Virginia
Thomas Simpson Evans (1777–1818), English mathematician
Thomas Evans (Archdeacon of Worcester) (fl. 1787–1817), Anglican priest
Thomas W. Evans (1823–1897), American dentist
Thomas Evans (poet, died 1833) (1766–1833), Welsh poet
Thomas Evans (British Army officer) (1776–1863), British-Canadian Army General
Thomas William Evans (1821–1892), High Sheriff of Derbyshire and MP
Thomas Evans (Medal of Honor) (1824–1866), recipient of the Congressional Medal of Honor
Thomas Evans (poet, 1840–65) (1840–1865), Welsh poet
Thomas Evans (Wisconsin politician) (1848–1919), Wisconsin State Assemblyman
Thomas Evans (cricketer) (1852–1916), English cricketer
Thomas Mellon Evans (1910–1997), American financier
Thomas Evans (Archdeacon of Carmarthen) (1914–1982), Anglican priest
Thomas B. Evans, Jr. (born 1931), former U.S. Congressman from Delaware
Thomas Saunders Evans, was an eminent British scholar of and translator into Latin and Ancient Greek, born on 8 March 1816
Tiffany Evans (born 1992), American singer and actress
Tim and Timothy Evans (disambiguation), multiple people
Tim Evans (footballer) (born 1953), Australian rules footballer
Tim Evans (British Army officer) (born 1962)
Timothy Evans (1924–1950), Welshman hanged for murders he did not commit
Timothy C. Evans (born 1943), American judge
Tolchard Evans (1901–1978), English songwriter and bandleader
Tom and Tommy Evans (disambiguation), multiple people
Tom Evans (rugby player) (1882–1955), Welsh international rugby player
Tom Evans (footballer, born 1896) (1896–after 1926), English-born football wing half
Tom Evans (footballer, born 1907) (1907–1993), Welsh footballer for Tottenham Hotspur
Tom Evans (Australian politician) (1917–2009), member of the Victorian Legislative Assembly
Tom Evans (musician) (1947–1983), English musician and songwriter, member of the band Badfinger
Tom Evans (baseball) (born 1974), major league baseball player
Tom Evans (footballer, born 1976) (born 1976), English-born Northern Ireland footballer
Tony Evans (disambiguation), multiple people
Tony Evans (footballer, born 1954), English footballer for Cardiff City and Birmingham City
Tony Evans (footballer, born 1960), English footballer for Colchester United
Tony Evans (Australian footballer born 1966), Australian rules footballer with St Kilda and Footscray
Tony Evans (Australian footballer born 1969), Australian rules footballer with the West Coast Eagles
Tony Evans (New Zealand footballer), New Zealand international football (soccer) player
Tony Evans (radio), Christian pastor and a radio broadcaster
Trefor Evans (born 1947), Welsh rugby union international
Trevor Evans (disambiguation)
Troy Evans (actor) (born 1948), American actor
Troy Evans (American football) (born 1977) American football linebacker
Tudor Evans, British politician
Tyreke Evans, American basketball player

V
Venida Evans (born 1947), American actress
Vernon W. Evans (1895–1975), American politician
Vernon Lee Evans (born 1949), American murderer
Victor Evans (1912–1975), English cricketer
Vin Evans (1935–2013), English cricketer
Vince Evans (born 1955), American football quarterback
Vincent Evans (1915–2007), British diplomat and international lawyer
Vincent Evans (artist) (1896–1976), Welsh artist
Vyvyan Evans, Welsh linguistics academic

W
Walker Evans (1903–1975), American photographer
Walker Evans (racing driver) (born 1938), American off-road racing driver
Walter Evans (disambiguation), multiple people
Walter Evans (American politician) (1842–1943), United States Representative from Kentucky
Walter Jenkin Evans (1856–1927), Welsh Presbyterian academic and writer
Walter Rice Evans (1863–1909), Welsh rugby union player
Walter Evans (footballer, born 1867) (1867–1897), Aston Villa F.C. and Wales international footballer
Sir Walter Evans, 1st Baronet (1872–1954), English hydraulic engineer, politician and public servant
Walter Allan Evans (1897–1955), Western Australian cricketer and footballer
Walter R. Evans (1920–1999), an American control theorist
Warren Evans (born 1948), American politician
Wayne Evans (disambiguation), multiple people
Wesley G. Evans (1844-1921), American politician
Wilbur Evans (1905–1987), American musical actor on Broadway, also in films and TV
Will, William and Willie Evans (disambiguation), multiple people
Will Evans (footballer) (born 1991), English footballer
Will Evans (rugby union) (born 1997), English rugby union flanker
William Evans (divine) (died c. 1720), Welsh Presbyterian divine
William Evans (British Army officer), British Army officer during the War of Spanish Succession
William Evans (lexicographer) (died 1776), Welsh minister and lexicographer
William David Evans (1767–1821), lawyer
William Evans (1788–1856), British MP for North Derbyshire
William Davies Evans (1790–1872), Welsh chess player
William Evans (watercolourist) (1798–1877), William Evans of Eton, English artist
William Evans (priest) (1801–1869), divine and naturalist
William Evans (landscape painter) (1811–1858), William Evans of Bristol, English artist
William Frederick Evans, British entomologist
Sir William Evans, 1st Baronet (1821–1892), British Liberal politician and benefactor
William Henry Evans (1842–????), Wisconsin legislator
William T. Evans (1843–1918), American art collector
William Evans (judge) (1846/7–1918), Welsh judge and legal author
William Evans (Medal of Honor) (1851–1881), American Indian Wars soldier
William D. Evans (1852–1963), jurist in the state of Iowa
William Evans (footballer) (1853–1919), Wales international footballer
William Gray Evans (1855–1911), president of the Denver Tramway Company
William Evans (Australian politician) (1856–1914), Australian union leader and politician
William Sanford Evans (1869–1950), Manitoba politician
W. H. Evans (1876–1956), lepidopterist
William Evans (Australian sportsman) (1876–1964), Queensland cricketer and rugby union player
William E. Evans (politician) (1877–1959), U.S. Congressman from California
William Evans (English cricketer) (1883–1913), South African-born English all-round cricketer
William Evans (rugby player born 1883) (1883–1946), Welsh international rugby player
William Evans (Wil Ifan) (1883–1968), Welsh poet and Archdruid
William Evans (cardiologist) (1895–1988), Welsh cardiologist and publisher
William W. Evans (c. 1908 – 1963), American lacrosse player
 William Evans (1920–2013), American musician a.k.a. Yusef Lateef
William J. Evans (general) (1924–2000), U.S. general
William Evans (basketball) (1932–2020), Olympic basketball player
William E. Evans (pharmacist), American pharmacist and researcher
Willie Evans (footballer, born 1912) (1912–1976), Welsh footballer
Willie Evans (running back) (1937–2017), American footballer
Willie Evans (footballer, born 1939), Ghanaian footballer
Willie Evans (defensive end) (born 1984), American footballer
Winifred Evans (fl. 1921), British actress
Winsome Evans (born 1941), Australian composer, arranger and harpsichordist
Woody Evans (born 1977), American writer
Wyn Evans (born 1947), British Anglican bishop
Wyndham Evans (born 1951), Welsh football player and manager
Wynne Evans (born 1972), Welsh tenor

Z
Zac Evans (born 1991), Welsh footballer
Zack Evans (born 1990), Canadian footballer (not soccer) from Saskatchewan

Fictional characters
Ben Evans (Sunset Beach), a fictional character in the US soap opera Sunset Beach
Derek Evans (Sunset Beach), a fictional character on the American soap opera Sunset Beach
Greg Evans (One Life to Live), a fictional character on the American soap opera One Life to Live
Isabel Evans, character in the Roswell TV series; twin sister to Max Evans
James Evans, Sr. and J.J. Evans, fictional characters on the American television series Good Times
 Jason Evans, a character in the 2004 American science fiction disaster movie The Day After Tomorrow
Joanna Evans née Hartman, fictional character from Australian soap opera Neighbours
 Katrina Evans, fictional character from British soap opera  Brookside
Lily Evans, a fictional character in the Harry Potter series; the mother of Harry Potter
Mark Evans (Harry Potter), minor character in the Harry Potter series of books by J. K. Rowling
Marlena Evans, character on the NBC soap opera Days of Our Lives
Max Evans, lead male character in the Roswell TV series; twin brother to Isabel Evans
Michael Evans (Good Times), a fictional character on the sitcom Good Times
Miranda Evans, a fictional character on the BBC soap opera Doctors
Relatives of Harry Potter discusses the family of Lily Potter, née Evans
  Roger Evans, fictional character on the sitcom Sister, Sister
Roy Evans (Neighbours), fictional character on the Australian soap opera Neighbours
Ryan Evans, character in High School Musical and its sequels; twin brother of Sharpay Evans
Sam Evans, character on the series Glee
Sharpay Evans, character in High School Musical, its sequels, and a spin-off film
Shaun Evans (One Life to Live), a fictional character on the ABC soap opera One Life to Live
Soul Eater Evans, character in manga series Soul Eater
 Trevor Evans, a fictional character in children's television series Fireman Sam

EastEnders
Barry Evans (EastEnders)
Derek Evans (EastEnders)
Jack Evans (EastEnders)
Janine Evans
Natalie Evans
Pat Evans
Roy Evans (EastEnders)

See also
Baron Carbery (Evans family), Irish Peerage created in 1715
Evans (baseball), baseball player
The Andrew Evans case of wrongful conviction in the United Kingdom
Bill Evans (album), a 1990 album by Paul Motian
Bob Evans Restaurants, a chain of American restaurants
Chukwudi Onuamadike, a Nigerian generally known as Evans
Earnest Evans, video game for the Sega Genesis and Sega CD
USS Frank E. Evans (DD-754), an Allen M. Sumner class destroyer
USCGC Raymond Evans (WPC–1110), a Sentinel class cutter
Sean Boog (born 1980), Sean Wayne Evans, American rapper
Zager and Evans, American rock-pop duo of the late 1960s and early '70s

Lists of people by surname